Richard Cholmeley may refer to:

 Richard Cholmondeley (1472–1521), or Cholmeley, English farmer, soldier and Lieutenant of the Tower of London
 Richard Cholmeley (died 1631) (1579–1631), English landowner and politician